Hotel Riu Plaza The Gresham Dublin, formerly The Gresham Hotel, is a historic four-star hotel on O'Connell Street in Dublin, Ireland. It is a Dublin institution and landmark building which was refurbished in the early 2000s.

History

Hotel founder, Thomas Gresham, was a foundling child, abandoned on the steps of the Royal Exchange, London. He was named after the founder of that institution, Sir Thomas Gresham, a famous merchant-politician in the Elizabethan era.

Gresham came to Ireland, and as a young man obtained employment in the service of William Beauman of Rutland Square (now Parnell Square), Dublin. After some time, and while still comparatively young, he became butler to this family.

In 1817, Gresham left Beauman's household and purchased 21-22 Sackville Street (now O'Connell Street). How he acquired the capital for the purchase is unknown. Over the next 48 years, he operated the hotel as a lodging house catering mostly to the wealthy aristocracy and MPs who passed through Dublin on their way to London.

By 1834 Gresham was noted as owning the Royal Marine Hotel in Kingstown. In 1833 he was the main local spokesman for opposition to a bill for the Dublin and Kingstown Railway (D&KR) extension to Dalkey, spending £1,200 in the process and being awarded a silver plate from locals when the bill failed. On being requested not to oppose an 1834 bill for an extension to Kingstown only, he agreed, saying he would not have opposed the earlier bill if the railway had acted with more courtesy. He also accepted £400 for D&KR shares he had bought for £100 in recognition.

The hotel is the setting for the final third of James Joyce’s short story "The Dead", set in the early years of the twentieth century. The story does not paint the hotel in a flattering light, referring to staff sleeping on duty and broken lighting.

The hotel was badly damaged during the Irish Civil War, but rebuilt during the 1920s to a high specification. Many of the original features from this time remain including Waterford crystal chandeliers. Today, the hotel has 288 bedrooms. The hotel became part of the Ryan Hotel group in 1978. The Ryan Group was bought by independent owners in 2004 and became a private company, The Gresham Hotel Group. The Gresham was renovated in 2013 and was sold to the Spanish RIU Hotels & Resorts chain in September 2016 for €92 million, becoming the Hotel Riu Plaza The Gresham Dublin.

In January 2018 Dublin City Council set about rehoming 14 homeless families that had been living at The Gresham to allow for the refurbishment of a number of bedrooms and suites at the hotel.

References

Sources
 
 

Hotels in Dublin (city)
Hotels established in 1817